Salamonie Dam (National ID # IN03005) is a dam in Wabash County, Indiana.

The earthen and rockfill dam was constructed in 1966 by the United States Army Corps of Engineers, with a height of 133 feet and 6100 feet long at its crest.  It impounds the Salamonie River for flood control and storm water managed, is owned by the Corps of Engineers, and is operated by the Corps and the Indiana Department of Natural Resources.

The reservoir it creates, Salamonie Lake, has a normal water surface of 4.5 miles and a maximum capacity of 263,600 acre-feet; the total project encompasses 12,000 acres of land and water.  Recreation includes boating, swimming and fishing for white crappie, channel catfish, white bass, and walleye.  The state also operates the adjacent Salamonie River State Forest, Mt. Hope State Recreation Area, Dora New Holland State Recreation Area, Lost Bridge State Recreation Area, and Mt. Etna State Recreation Area.

References 

Dams in Indiana
Reservoirs in Indiana
United States Army Corps of Engineers dams
Buildings and structures in Huntington County, Indiana
Dams completed in 1966
Bodies of water of Huntington County, Indiana